USS Velocity was a captured British schooner acquired by the Union Navy from the prize court during the American Civil War.

She was put into service  by the Union Navy to patrol navigable waterways of the Confederacy to prevent the South from trading with other countries. Unfortunately for the Union Navy, she was captured, in turn, by the Confederate Navy off the Texas coast.

Service history 

Velocity joined the West Gulf Blockading Squadron shortly after her acquisition, deploying with the blockade off Sabine Pass. There, on 25 November, she assisted Kensington, Rachel Seaman, and another prize vessel, Dan, in the capture of the British schooner Maria and the Confederate schooner Course. She is believed to have continued to serve as a Confederate gunboat, but her final disposition is unknown.

See also

Blockade runners of the American Civil War
List of ships captured in American Civil War

References 

Ships of the Union Navy
Schooners of the United States Navy
Gunboats of the United States Navy
American Civil War patrol vessels of the United States